Armin Büchel (born 15 July 1945) is a Liechtenstein judoka. He competed in the men's half-middleweight event at the 1972 Summer Olympics.

References

External links
 

1945 births
Living people
Liechtenstein male judoka
Olympic judoka of Liechtenstein
Judoka at the 1972 Summer Olympics
Place of birth missing (living people)